On 2 March 2021, a Let L-410 Turbolet of South Sudan Supreme Airlines crashed in Pieri, Uror County, South Sudan on a domestic flight to Yuai Airstrip, South Sudan.

Aircraft

The accident aircraft was a Let L-410 UVP-E, with the fake registration of HK-4274. The plane was the 1000th L-410 built and had previously been owned by Aeroflot, Universal-Avia, Business Aviation Center and Forty Eight Aviation. It was sold to South Sudan Supreme Airlines in 2017.

Accident
The aircraft crashed immediately after taking off from Pieri Airstrip, South Sudan on a domestic scheduled passenger flight. 
There were 8 passengers, plus two crew on board. The South Sudan Civil Aviation Authority, who are investigating the accident, announced that about 10 minutes after takeoff, the flight suffered from an engine failure. The flight then attempted to turn back to land, but the other engine then failed, causing the plane to lose speed and crash with little forward motion, after likely stalling.

References

External links 

Aviation accidents and incidents in 2021
Aviation accidents and incidents in South Sudan
Accidents and incidents involving the Let L-410 Turbolet
2021 in South Sudan
March 2021 events in South Sudan